The following is a list of all suspensions and fines enforced in the National Hockey League during the 2012–13 NHL season. It lists which players or coaches of what team have been punished for which offense and the amount of punishment they have received. The season was shortened to 48 games due to the 2012–13 NHL lockout. No pre-season games were played.

Suspensions
† - suspension carried over from 2011–12 NHL season

‡ - suspension covered at least one 2013 post-season game

Fines
Fines were changed for this season such that players can be fined up to 50% of one day's salary, up to a maximum of $10,000.00 U.S. for their first offense, and $15,000.00 U.S. for any subsequent offenses. The previous maximum fine before this season was only $2500.00 U.S., for players.

See also 
 2012–13 NHL transactions
 List of 2012–13 NHL Three Star Awards
 2011–12 NHL suspensions and fines
 2013–14 NHL suspensions and fines
 2012 NHL Entry Draft
 2012 in sports
 2013 in sports

References

Suspension And Fines
National Hockey League suspensions and fines